Central Gazelle Rural LLG is a local-level government (LLG) of East New Britain Province, Papua New Guinea.

Wards
01. Napapar No.1
02. Napapar No.2
03. Napapar No.3
04. Napapar No. 4
05. Napapar No. 5
06. Vunagogo
07. Takekel
08. Kadakada
09. Rakunai
10. Latlat
11. Navunaram
12. Tavui-Liu
13. Malmaluan
14. Karavia No.I
15. Karavia No.2
16. Tavilo Settlement
17. Talakua
18. Kerevat Township
19. Tinganagalip
82. Kerevat Urban

References

Local-level governments of East New Britain Province